Vladimir Bolea (born 23 September 1971) is a Moldovan politician currently serving as the Minister of Agriculture and Food Industry in the Gavrilița Cabinet.

References 

Living people
Moldovan MPs 2019–2023
1971 births